The Piraeus Lion is one of four lion statues on display at the Venetian Arsenal, Italy, where it was displayed as a symbol of Venice's patron saint, Saint Mark.

History 
It was originally located in Piraeus, the harbour of Athens. It was looted by Venetian naval commander Francesco Morosini in 1687 as plunder taken in the Great Turkish War against the Ottoman Empire, during which the Venetians captured Athens and Morosini's cannons caused damage to the Parthenon that was matched only by his subsequent sack of the city. Copies of the statue can also be seen at the Piraeus Archaeological Museum and the Swedish Museum of National Antiquities in Stockholm.

The lion was originally sculpted in about 360 BC, and became a famous landmark in Piraeus, Athens, having stood there since the 1st or 2nd century AD. It is depicted in a sitting pose, with a hollow throat and the mark of a pipe (now lost) running down its back; this suggests that it was at some point used as a fountain. This is consistent with the description of the statue from the 1670s, which said that water flowed from the lion's mouth into a cistern at its feet.

The statue, which is made of white marble and stands some 3 m (9 ft.) high, is particularly noteworthy for having been, in the second half of the 11th century, inscribed by Scandinavians who carved two lengthy runic inscriptions into the shoulders and flanks of the lion. The runes are carved in the shape of an elaborate lindworm dragon-headed scroll, in much the same style as on runestones in Scandinavia. The Vikings who carved the runes on the lion could have been Varangians, mercenaries in the service of the Byzantine (Eastern Roman) Emperor, or Vikings who travelled from Scandinavia around Europe’s Atlantic coastline.

Inscriptions and translations 

The inscriptions were not recognised as runes until the Swedish diplomat Johan David Åkerblad identified them at the end of the 18th century. They are in the shape of a lindworm (a flightless dragon with serpentine body and two or no legs) and were first translated in the mid-19th century by Carl Christian Rafn, the Secretary of the Kongelige Nordiske Oldskrift-Selskab (Royal Society of Nordic Antiquaries). The inscriptions are heavily eroded due to weathering and air pollution in Venice, making many of the individual runes barely legible. This has required translators to reconstruct some of the runes, filling in the blanks to determine what words they represented.

There have been several attempts to decipher and translate the text. Below follow Rafn's early attempt (1854) and Eric Brate's attempt (1914), which is considered to be the most successful one.

Rafn's translation 
Rafn's attempt is as follows, with the legible letters shown in bold and the reconstructed ones unbolded:

Right side of the lion:

 ASMUDR : HJU : RUNAR : ÞISAR : ÞAIR : ISKIR : AUK: ÞURLIFR : ÞURÞR : AUK : IVAR : AT : BON : HARADS : HAFA : ÞUAT : GRIKIAR : UF : HUGSAÞU : AUK : BANAÞU : Asmund cut these runes with Asgeir and Thorleif, Thord and Ivar, at the request of Harold the Tall, though the Greeks considered about and forbade it.

Left side of the lion:

 HAKUN : VAN: ÞIR : ULFR : AUK : ASMUDR : AUK : AURN : HAFN : ÞESA : ÞIR : MEN : LAGÞU : A : UK : HARADR : HAFI : UF IABUTA : UPRARSTAR : VEGNA : GRIKIAÞIÞS : VARÞ : DALKR : NAUÞUGR : I : FIARI : LAÞUM : EGIL : VAR : I : FARU : MIÞ : RAGNARR : TIL : RUMANIU . . . . AUK : ARMENIU :
 Hakon with Ulf and Asmund and Örn conquered this port. These men and Harold Hafi imposed a heavy fine on account of the revolt of the Greek people. Dalk is detained captive in far lands. Egil is gone on an expedition with Ragnar into Romania and Armenia.

Some have tried to trace Harald Hardrada's name on the inscription, but the time it was carved does not coincide with his time in the service of the emperor.

Erik Brate's translation 
Erik Brate's interpretation from 1914 is considered to be the most successful one.

See also 

 Berezan' Runestone
 Greece Runestones
 Italy Runestones
 Runic inscriptions in Hagia Sophia
 Chinese guardian lions

Literature 
 Sven B. F. Jansson, "Pireuslejonets runor", Nordisk Tidskrift för vetenskap konst och industri, utgiven av Letterstedtska Föreningen. Stockholm (1984).

References 

4th-century BC Greek sculptures
11th-century inscriptions
Art and cultural repatriation
Runestones
Varangian Guard
Culture in Venice
Outdoor sculptures in Venice
Monuments and memorials in Venice
Hellenistic-style Roman sculptures
Lion
Lion
Byzantine Empire-related inscriptions
Roman Athens
Medieval Athens
Sculptures of lions
Graffiti (archaeology)
Venetian Arsenal